Källby is a locality situated in Götene Municipality, Västra Götaland County, Sweden. It had 1,586 inhabitants in 2010.

A major industry and employer is Gunnar Dafgård AB, founded in 1937, which manufactures various cold dishes such as pan pizza, pies and ready meals.

Driving distances to:
 Lidköping 12 km,
 Götene 14 km,
 Gothenburg 144 km, and
 Stockholm 339 km 172 on Highway (South Lake)

References

See also
Källby Runestones

Populated places in Västra Götaland County
Populated places in Götene Municipality